Afrotrichloris is a genus of East African plants in the grass family.

The type species is named for Ferdinando Martini (1841-1928), who resided as Minister of Colonies and later Governor of Eritrea in the Royal Italian government. .

 Species
 Afrotrichloris hyaloptera Clayton - Ethiopia, Somalia
 Afrotrichloris martinii Chiov. - Somalia

See also 
 List of Poaceae genera

References

External links 
 Grassbase - The World Online Grass Flora

Chloridoideae
Poaceae genera
Flora of Northeast Tropical Africa